18th SFBAFCC Awards
December 16, 2019

Picture: 
Once Upon a Time in Hollywood

Animated Feature: 
I Lost My Body

Documentary: 
Apollo 11

Foreign Language Picture: 
Parasite

The 18th San Francisco Bay Area Film Critics Circle Awards, honoring the best in film for 2019, were given on December 16, 2019.

Winners and nominees

These are the nominees for the 18th SFFCC Awards. Winners are listed at the top of each list:

Special awards

Special Citation for Independent Cinema
 One Cut of the Dead, directed by Shin'ichirô Ueda
 The Cat and the Moon, directed by Alex Wolff
 Fiddler: A Miracle of Miracles, directed by Max Lewkowicz
 Sócrates, directed by Alexandre Moratto

Marlon Riggs Award
 Jimmie Fails and Joe Talbot

References

External links
 San Francisco Bay Area Film Critics Circle

San Francisco Film Critics Circle Awards
2019 film awards
2019 in San Francisco